The lists of schools in the United Kingdom are organised by country:
Lists of schools in England
Lists of schools in Northern Ireland
Lists of schools in Scotland
Lists of schools in Wales

See also
List of schools in Guernsey
List of schools in the Isle of Man
List of schools in Jersey